Timothy Linehan (4 August 1905 – date of death unknown) was an Irish Fine Gael politician. A solicitor, he was first elected to Dáil Éireann as a Teachta Dála (TD) for the Cork North constituency at the 1937 general election. He was re-elected at the 1938 and 1943 general elections. He lost his seat at the 1944 general election.

References

1905 births
Year of death missing
Fine Gael TDs
Members of the 9th Dáil
Members of the 10th Dáil
Members of the 11th Dáil
Politicians from County Cork
Irish solicitors
People educated at Castleknock College